Gandhidham is one of the 182 Legislative Assembly constituencies of Gujarat state in India. It is part of Kachchh district and is reserved for candidates belonging to the Scheduled Castes and was created after the 2008 delimitation, and is numbered as 5-Gandhidham.

List of segments
This assembly seat represents the following segments,

 Gandhidham Taluka
 Bhachau Taluka (Part) Villages – Kadol, Manfara, Vamka, May, Kharoi, Ner, Baniari, Morgar, Amardi, Kabrau, Kumbhardi, Bandhadi, Sikara, Meghpar (Kunjisar), Karmariya, Vondhada, Halra, Rampar, Lakhpat, Vijpasar, Vondh, Chopadva, Lunva, Sukhpar, Bhujpar, Chirai Nani, Chirai Moti, Chhadavada, Samakhiari, Piprapati, Bhachau (M).
Anjar Taluka (Part) Village – Varsana.

Members of Legislative Assembly

Election results

2022

2017

2012

See also
 List of constituencies of the Gujarat Legislative Assembly
 Kachchh district

References

External links
 

Assembly constituencies of Gujarat
Gandhidham
Politics of Kutch district